The Zii EGG is a handheld product platform from Creative Technology subsidiary ZiiLABS. According to ZiiLABS, the Zii Egg was designed for OEM sales, meaning that the device was marketed to sell to third parties rather than retail customers where they can modify it and sell it under their own brand rather than Creative or ZiiLABS. Creative later introduced a consumer model, the Creative Zii. The Egg was announced at the end of July 2009 with ZiiLABS' Plaszma OS platform and support for Google's Android OS. The EGG was shipped from ZiiLABS in the later half of August 2009. The first available firmware with Android was released on November 2, 2009.

According to the Zii website the Zii EGG could provide 1080p video, and the media engine for video codec, media processing and 3D graphics acceleration is an array of floating-point processors (most likely some kind of digital signal processor cores) called StemCells. The ZMS-05 used in the Zii EGG has 24 of these processing units.

Specifications
 Capacitive 10-point multi-gesture touch display
 Internal hardware GPS receiver
 3.5” 320x480 color display
 Bluetooth 2.1 + EDR (only A2DP is currently supported, and is not yet implemented in their Android port)
 X-Fi software support (not yet implemented in the ZiiLABS SDKs)
 3-axis Accelerometer
 Up to 32 GB Internal Flash Storage
 SDHC slot (supports up to 32 GB of external SDHC Card)
 Ambient light sensor
 32 MB NOR Flash (Linux Kernel Boot ROM)
 256 MB Mobile DDR RAM
 720p and 1080p output  (this only works via a proprietary adapter which has not been sold for over 6 months, though it is available via the Zii Dock accessory which is now available for sale)
 Composite video out  (this only works via a proprietary adapter which has not been sold for over 6 months, though it is available via the Zii Dock accessory which is now available for sale)
 Microphone
 2 cameras: 1 forward-facing VGA camera, 1 rear-facing HD camera
 1200 mAH rechargeable lithium-ion battery
 Wi-Fi 802.11 b/g

Output connections
 USB 2.0 Mini-B (MTP and Charging)
 ZiiLink  (a proprietary type of connector which is only available currently via the Zii Link ZiiEGG-docking station)
 HDMI (via ZiiLink)
 Component VGA(via ZiiLink)
 3.5 mm headphone connector
 Built in mono speaker

See also
 Creative ZEN
 Creative Technology
 Zii Labs
 Creative Zii

References

External links
 ZiiLabs Website
 Zii EGG Developer Website
 Creative Technology Website

Portable media players
Touchscreen portable media players
Creative Technology products
Creative Technology
Android (operating system) devices